Coventry South West was a parliamentary constituency in the city of Coventry.  It returned one Member of Parliament (MP)  to the House of Commons of the Parliament of the United Kingdom.

The constituency was created for the February 1974 general election, and abolished for the 1997 general election, when it was partially replaced by Coventry South.

Boundaries
1974–1983: The County Borough of Coventry wards of Cheylesmore, Earlsdon, Westwood, Whoberley, and Woodlands.

1983–1997: The City of Coventry wards of Earlsdon, Wainbody, Westwood, Whoberley, and Woodlands.

Members of Parliament

Elections

Elections in the 1970s

Elections in the 1980s

Elections in the 1990s

Notes and references 

Parliamentary constituencies in Coventry
Parliamentary constituencies in the West Midlands (county) (historic)
Constituencies of the Parliament of the United Kingdom established in 1974
Constituencies of the Parliament of the United Kingdom disestablished in 1997